Jirayu Tangsrisuk (born September 19, 1993), also known as James Jirayu, is a Thai actor, singer and model. He is known for his roles in the movies and the television dramas such as Suphapburut Juthathep (2013), Timeline (2014), The One in My Heart (2015), The Loyal Wife (2016), Fallen Angel (2017), Underneath the Same Sky (2018), Game of Affection (2018), Repercussion (2019), Mist of Love (2020) and Prophecy of Love (2020).

Early life
Jirayu Tangsrisuk was born in Phichit, Thailand. He is the youngest child of Sermchai Tangsrisuk and Shotika Tangsrisuk. He has one older sister, Dr. Jularat Tangsrisuk, MD. His parents nicknamed him "James" after James Bond (from the James Bond films). After having finished junior high school from Wachira Kindergarten, Jirayu attended high school at Phichit Phitthakhom School, and at the same time he also was a territorial defense student. He completed Grade 3, which means he is equivalent and may request permission to use the title Staff Sergeant (completed Grade 3 combined with an academic degree), also he is exempt from conscription. After he'd finished high school, he then continued his education at the Faculty of Communication Arts at Rangsit University, in the field of radio and television broadcasting. Later in 2013 he received a scholarship (The Artist), therefore switched to study at the Faculty of Business Administration, majoring in Retail Business Management until graduation. He attended the graduation ceremony in December 2017.

James Jirayu learned how to dance and sing at a young age and he even had his own band, where he played bass guitar in high school. In 2011, he won a model contest held by the cosmetics brand, Mistine, and started his career as a model. In many interviews, he said that because he was a shy kid he had never wanted to be an actor or a movie star before, but his mother wanted him to be. Also that he had great interest in computer, especially in computer games, so he then wanted to study and to work in a field of Computer Science or Information Technology (IT) for his future career.

In April 2012, Charnchalard Dhaweesap, the owner of an entertainment agency called "Meta Talent Management", saw James' photos on Facebook and scouted him. Seven other agencies also came for him, but he started his career in the entertainment industry under Charnchalard's management. On December 14, 2017, James confirmed in an interview that the contract between him and his manager (Charnchalard) had expired for a while, but Charnchalard's assistant, Siri Vorabutra, still took care of him and helped him with scheduling dramas, commercial advertisements and events. He also said that the relationship between him and his ex-manager remained friendly. Charnchalard still gives him advice from time to time.

Career
James Jirayu made his debut and rose to stardom after starring in the lakorn Suphapburut Juthathep: Khun Chai Puttipat, [The Gentlemen of Juthathep (RTGS: Suphapburut Chuthathep)], airing in May 2013. In September, he starred, for the first time, in a movie called First Love and two other dramas Thong Neu Gao (Angel Heart) and Ruk Sudrit (Race). In just a year, James became one of the most sought-after presenters/actors in Thailand. His presenter's fees were then possibly outstripping that of the famous actor Nadech Kugimiya.

In January 2014, James held his 1st concert James Ji Monkey King Fan Meeting. In February, his second movie, Timeline with Jarinporn Joonkiat, was released (Okinawa International Movie Festival 2015 Special Screening Movie). At the end of this year, he arrived in Vietnam to visit the children with heart diseases at Tam Duc Hospital in Ho Chi Minh City with 365 Daband (a famous boy band in Vietnam). He also made his debut in Japan when "Ruk Sudrit (Race)" was shown on TBS Channel.

In April 2015, his first photo book (shot in Japan), JAMES JI UP CLOSE AND PERSONAL IN JAPAN by Michael Chevas was published. In May, his drama Neung Nai Suang (The One in My Heart) with Urassaya Sperbund aired. In June, he held Magic James the Concert. In September, he appeared on the stage of Tokyo Girls Collection (TGC) 2015 Autumn/Winter as a guest when he traveled to Japan for 2 months to take singing and dancing lessons. In October, it was confirmed by Lakorn Thai producer, Da Hathairat that James and Natapohn Tameeruks would pair up in "Yai Sanaeha"; however, this lakorn was cancelled due to a problem with script-writing. On November 9, James held his 1st fan meeting in Japan, which gathered 600 people (fans and the media). 
At the end of 2015, he returned to Vietnam to take a martial arts class at Johnny Tri Nguyen's Lien Phong Academy in preparation for his new drama Padiwaradda (The Loyal Wife), as the lakorn featured many action scenes.

On January 13, 2016, his second drama with Ranee Campen, "Padiwaradda (The Loyal Wife)" aired. In the same month, CH3 broadcast the TV show, Tabi Japan with James Jirayu, focusing on the six prefectures of Tohoku region. He performed as a model on the stage of Yohji Yamamoto 2016–17, Autumn-Winter Paris Men's Collection. On March 19, he appeared on the stage of the 22nd Tokyo Girls Collection 2016 Spring/Summer. Filming for Nueng Dao Fa Diao (Underneath The Same Sky) and Game Sanaeha (Game of Affection / Game of Love) with Natapohn Tameeruks began. In June 2016, James released his debut CD Album and first photo album (shot by himself) Kimi Dake I Love You in Japan.

In 2017, James landed 3rd on the top 10 highest-paid actors list in Thailand. In March, his first drama with Kimberley Anne Woltemas, titled Buang Hong (Fallen Angel) aired. In April, he appeared on the Tokusatsu series, Idol x Warrior Miracle Tunes!, broadcast by TV Tokyo as "Demon King". On May 19, 2017, he became the goodwill ambassador for the 130th anniversary of diplomatic relations between Thailand and Japan. In June, his Japanese short film Home Away From Home was released on YouTube. On September 19, 2017, James held James4D: Concert.
 
In April 2018, he landed 2nd on the top 7 highest-paid actors list in Thailand. In June 2018, it was confirmed that James and Preechaya Pongthananikorn would star in the lakorn Prayakorn Sorn Ruk (Prophecy of Love), directed by Yuttana Lorpanpaiboon.

In the beginning of 2019, he started filming his new drama Leh Banpakarn (Mist of Love) with Natapohn Tameeruks.

His role, "Ah-Sa", in Krong Kam (Repercussion), airing from February 26 to April 30, 2019, has resulted in intense adoration of him. He also won the 11th Nataraja Awards, "Best Actor in a Leading Role" for the role Ah-Sa in 2020. And on October 29, 2020, the lakorn Krong Kam (Repercussion) received an award, "Special Awards for Foreign Dramas", from The Tokyo Drama Awards, The International Drama Festival in Tokyo (国際ドラマフェスティバル in TOKYO).

On March 26, 2021, he released his first mini music album SEE MORE. The album consists of five songs: (Missing You) Always, Step by Step, Hold On, Till I Found You, and Cause of You.

On December 2, 2021, James' new movie "OM! Cruch On Me!", an action drama, rom-com and fantasy movie, with Maylada Susri, will be released in theaters.

James Jirayu and Ranee Campen is one of the top "Koojin (Imaginary couple)" or most shipped on-screen couples of Channel 3. Their fans call them "Jiranee". He is also well known in Southeast Asia, China and Japan.

Filmography

Television Dramas

Films

Television show(s) and YouTube program(s)

Discography

Music Singles and Albums

Original Soundtracks and Music Videos

Promotional singles

Concerts
James Ji Monkey King Fan Meeting (2014)
The K Festival Concert in Incheon, South Korea (2014)
Lor Mak Mak Concert (2015)
Magic James: The Concert (2015)
Concert Love Is In The Air : Channel 3 Charity Concert (2017)
James4D: Concert (2017)
Concert We Will Love You: Channel 3 48th Anniversary (2018)
AIS 30th Anniversary (2019)

Awards and nominations

References

External links
 Jirayu Tangsrisuk's Official Website

 
 
 

1993 births
Living people
Jirayu Tangsrisuk
Jirayu Tangsrisuk
Jirayu Tangsrisuk
Jirayu Tangsrisuk
Jirayu Tangsrisuk
Jirayu Tangsrisuk
Jirayu Tangsrisuk
Jirayu Tangsrisuk